The Jimbolia Veche oil field is an oil field located in Jimbolia, Timiș County. It was discovered in 1980 and developed by Zeta Petroleum. It began production in 1980 and produces oil.

References

Oil fields in Romania